Felice Maria Nerini (1705 - 17 January 1787) was an Italian writer and historian, mainly of the Hieronymite order.

Biography
He was born in Milan. He joined the Hieronymite order, and rose rapidly to its procurator general and abbot. He then served Pope Benedict XIV as consultant for the Congregation of the Holy Office in Rome. He helped collect, for the convent of Santi Bonifacio ed Alessio in Rome, instruments and books for the study of mathematics and the sciences. He was patronized by Cardinal Angelo Maria Querini, to whom his works, in Latin, are dedicated. These include: 
Hieronymianae familiae vetera monumenta ad amplissimum Dominum
De suscepto itinere subalpino: Epistolae Tres (1753)
De templo et coenobio sanctorum Bonifacii et Alexii historica monumenta

References

1705 births
1787 deaths
18th-century Italian writers
18th-century Italian male writers
18th-century Italian historians
Hieronymites
Writers from Milan